The Silver Key is an adventure module for the 2nd edition of the Advanced Dungeons & Dragons fantasy role-playing game, published in 1996.

Plot summary
In The Silver Key, recommended for a party of two to six characters of levels two to eight, orcs roam the country as the human residents of the city of Horonshar prepare for war. A force of human soldiers was ambushed a few days ago, and taken prisoner was an important military officer who carried the Silver Key, a magical item that aids with teleportation. The player characters must infiltrate the orcish fortress, rescue the officer, and retrieve the key before the orcs are able to learn how to use it.

The adventurers must be polymorphed into orcs in order to accomplish their infiltration. The adventure includes a set of rules that details how players gain "orc points" for convincing roleplaying; a character that gets too many points becomes an orc permanently.

No map is given for the orcish fortress, but instead the adventure uses a flow chart. Regions of the chart determine encounters and information yielded, and the characters move from one region to another by means of dice roles.

Publication history
The Silver Key was published by TSR, Inc. in 1996.

Reception
Cliff Ramshaw reviewed The Silver Key for Arcane magazine, rating it a 6 out of 10 overall. Ramshaw felt that the "orc points" system would be fun, "but unfair on the better roleplayers". He felt that the system of moving around in the orcish fortress by flow chart and die roll was "more like Monopoly than AD&D; there's even a 'Go to jail' - sorry, 'Busted' - region. Unfortunately, this innovative method of portraying strangers' confusions in a fortress preparing for war means that players have next to little say over their own destinies. Even the two key locations here don't warrant maps." Ramshaw concluded the review by saying: "The Silver Key's originality is married by an over-reliance on the dice, its occasionally ambiguous rules, and a paucity of detail for critical locations and encounters. Experienced referees could turn it into an enjoyable jaunt; those less so should steer well clear."

References

Dungeons & Dragons modules
Role-playing game supplements introduced in 1996